Paige Selenski (born June 30, 1990) is an American field hockey player. Her position is forward. At the 2012 Summer Olympics, she competed for the United States women's national field hockey team in the women's event.

Selenski was born in Kingston, Pennsylvania. She graduated from Dallas High School in Dallas, Pennsylvania in 2008 and went on to attend the University of Virginia.  There, she majored in English.

References

External links
 

1990 births
Living people
American female field hockey players
Olympic field hockey players of the United States
Field hockey players at the 2012 Summer Olympics
Field hockey players at the 2011 Pan American Games
Virginia Cavaliers field hockey players
Pan American Games gold medalists for the United States
Pan American Games medalists in field hockey
Medalists at the 2011 Pan American Games
American people of Polish descent